Little Bay  is a suburb in the Eastern Suburbs of Sydney, in the state of New South Wales, Australia. Little Bay is located 14 kilometres south-east of the Sydney central business district and is part of the local government area of the City of Randwick.

Little Bay is a coastal suburb, to the north of Botany Bay. The suburb takes its name from the geographical formation called Little Bay, which also features a small beach. The Prince Henry Hospital was a famous landmark once located at Little Bay.

History
The Little Bay area was first used as a sanitation camp during Sydney's smallpox outbreak in 1881–82, to isolate the healthy contacts of sufferers of the disease. At first, a "tent city" was established on the beach, but as well the government decided to build a permanent hospital here to treat infectious diseases. Little Bay was an ideal location because it was isolated from settlements but still close enough to Sydney. The Coast Hospital was particularly valuable during the bubonic plague in Sydney of 1900 and then again when soldiers returning from Europe brought the influenza virus back in 1919. The Coast Hospital became Prince Henry Hospital in 1934. In 2001 services were transferred to Prince of Wales Hospital, Sydney and the hospital site became available for residential use.

There are still nineteen heritage listed buildings on site from the Coast/Prince Henry days.

Two landmarks still remain from the hospital days. One is the Coast Cemetery, situated south of Little Bay. Some two thousand five hundred plus people were buried there, with the oldest graves being located further south, towards Cape Banks. The cemetery was taken over by the National Parks and Wildlife Service of New South Wales when the Botany Bay National Park was created. Most of the graves are now under vegetation to protect them.

Another landmark is the Interdenominational War Memorial Chapel, which overlooks Little Bay. It was destroyed by fire in October 1981, but was subsequently rebuilt in 1982. Outside the chapel there is an array of memorial plaques dedicated to former staff of the hospital.

Little Bay was originally called Yarra Junction but mail would end up in Melbourne (Vic) so the residents asked for the suburb's name to be changed. This was granted and changed to Phillip Bay Heights (Phillip Bay is a suburb located between Little Bay and Botany Bay) but as everyone called the area Little Bay this was the name that was eventually officially adopted. During the 1950s, much of the land was provided to returned servicemen via War Ballots.

In 1969, the international artists Christo and Jeanne-Claude created the world's largest sculpture at Little Bay called: "Wrapped Coast – One Million Square Feet, Little Bay, Sydney, Australia". Many Australian artists and students volunteered to assist them wrapping 2.4 kilometres of coastline, which was 46 to 244 metres wide, up to 26 metres high at the northern cliffs, and at sea level at the southern sandy beach. It introduced a radical work of art which at the time was controversial and polarised the community. It marked the beginning of a new chapter of contemporary art in Australia and today is considered a triumphant project. Christo and Jeanne-Claude went on to wrap cars, galleries, islands, and even the Reichstag building in Germany.

Heritage listings 
Little Bay has a number of heritage-listed sites, including:
 1430 Anzac Parade: Prince Henry Site

Little Bay Beach

In the stretch of coastline south of Sydney Harbour (Port Jackson), Little Bay Beach is the last significant sand beach before Botany Bay. Little Bay took its name from the obvious comparison to nearby Long Bay at Malabar. On the evening of 3 December 1797, George Bass, at the commencement of his first major voyage of discovery in the waters of southern Australia, anchored there in his open whaleboat with a crew of six, referring to it in his journal as Little Harbour.

Little Bay beach is semi-circular in shape and enclosed by headlands to the south and north. Its narrow entrance provides significant shelter from prevailing sea conditions.

A ring-of-rocks bathing pool known as Little Bay Rock Pool or Little Bay Baths was created from beach rocks at the southern end of the beach in the early 1900s to provide safe shark-free bathing for nurses resident nearby at the Coast Hospital. The pool is still partially intact.

Little Bay is not a surf beach and does not have an undertow or "rip" unless there is a strong sea from the south or south-east running into the bay. The beach is not patrolled by lifesavers. However surf lifesavers and the Westpac Life Saver Rescue Helicopter Service attend to incidents. Rock fishing is very popular along the rocky coastline to the north and south of Little Bay, but it is also very dangerous with deaths occurring occasionally. Information on water safety at Little Bay is provided on the Little Bay Beach web site.

In February 2022, a 35-year-old expatriate British diving instructor was killed by a white shark while swimming off Little Bay Beach. He was the first person killed by a shark in Sydney coastal waters since the death of Marcia Hathaway in 1963.

Pollution
As the population of Sydney grew, the beaches south of the Malabar sewage treatment plant such as Little Bay, became increasingly polluted. By the 1980s, the water was brown and fat was deposited on the sand and rocks, making them slimy and smelly. After the Malabar Deep Ocean Outfall commenced operation in 1990, the beaches to the south became significantly cleaner within a very short period of time. Today, Little Bay is consistently one of the cleanest beaches in Sydney, in terms of water clarity and bacteria counts.

Landmarks
The north headland of Botany Bay (Henry Head) has a number of features, including two old gun emplacements at Fort Banks, and an unattended lighthouse and the wreck of the SS Minmi on what is called Pussycat Island. The older of the gun emplacements, known as the Henry Head Battery was originally built just after the completion of Bare Island to provide additional coverage of the entrance to Botany Bay.
 Former Prince Henry Hospital
 Spinal Cord Injuries Australia
 Aboriginal Health College
 Prince Henry Development Project
 Little Bay Weather Station

Notable residents
 Russell Fairfax, rugby league player
Greg Inglis, rugby league player
 Anthony Maroon, radio personality
 Tony Rafty, cartoonist
 Jane Saville, race walker
 Fiona Stanley, paediatrician and 2003 Australian of the Year
 David Warner, Test cricketer
Nathan Williamson, broadcaster/journalist

Street names
Many street names in Little Bay were derived from Aboriginal words or eminent people, especially those associated with medicine through the presence of the former Prince Henry Hospital. 

Sources:

Transport
Little Bay is served by five bus services operated by Transdev John Holland:

Sport and recreation
 St Michael's Golf Club
 The Coast Golf Club
 Surf Life Saving Sydney, Branch Office at 16 Murra Murra Place, Little Bay. Surf Life Saving Sydney

References

External links

  [CC-By-SA]

 
Suburbs of Sydney
Bays of New South Wales
Heliports in Australia